Stuart Jackson is a Scottish yachtsman. He attained 2nd place as skipper of the Barclays Adventurer in the 2004/05 Global Challenge, owns the Aurora of London and skippered the De Lage Landen in the Clipper Round the World 11-12.

Early life and education

Jackson was born in Dubai to parents Simon and Shirley Jackson. Moving back to his native Scotland, he attended Belmont Academy in Ayr, before graduating with a degree in Chemistry from the University of Aberdeen. Jackson went on to gain his Yachtmaster Ocean qualification.

Early career 

In 2000, Jackson sailed aboard his father's yacht in the Atlantic Rally for Cruisers. On reaching the Caribbean, Jackson then sailed back to Scotland alone, going via Bermuda and the Azores.

Global Challenge 

Jackson was the skipper of Barclays Adventurer for the duration of the 2004/05 Global Challenge, which lasted 10 months and finished on 18 July 2005. With Jackson at the helm, the Barclays Adventurer won the first leg of the challenge in Buenos Aires. Following his time on the Barclays Adventurer, Jackson went on to become Regional International Trade Director for Barclays.

Aurora of London 

Jackson owns and skippers the Challenge 67' yacht the Aurora of London. The yacht is made available for a variety of sailing opportunities including Team Building events, Corporate Hospitality and Adventure Sailing.

Clipper Round the World 11-12 

Jackson was involved in the pre-race training programme for the Clipper 11-12 crews. Jackson was then recruited to skipper the De Lage Landen, racing under the Dutch flag, after the first leg of the race. He skippers a crew of 51 which includes 29 men and 22 women with an average age of 41.

References

External links 
Clipper Round the World
Ocean Experience

Living people
Scottish male sailors (sport)
Year of birth missing (living people)